

Aluberht, or Ealubeorht, was a medieval Bishop of Selsey
, consecrated between 747 and 765 and died between 772 and 780.

Citations

References

External links
 

Bishops of Selsey
8th-century English bishops